Jose Biohon Catindig Jr. (born January 13, 1962), also known as Joey, is a Filipino politician currently serving as councilor of Santa Rosa, Laguna since 2022. He previously served as mayor of the city from 2005 to 2007, following the assassination of Mayor Leon Arcillas, and vice mayor from 1995 to 1998 and from 2001 to 2005.

Early life
Catindig was born on January 13, 1962, in Balibago, Santa Rosa, Laguna. He is the youngest of nine children of Jose Y. Catindig and Ignacia del Mundo Biojon. He studied primary education at the Balibago Elementary School, finished secondary schooling at the Santa Rosa Educational Institution, and finished tertiary studies at the Adamson University, where he earned a Bachelor of Arts degree in political science.

Political life

Barangay Politician (1989–1995)
He dreamt of entering politics early in his life and by 1989 he ran in the barangay election and became a barangay councilor and barangay captain of Balibago.

Municipal Councilor
After his term as a Barangay Cgairman, he ran as municipal councilor and won in 1992 and served his full term up to 1995.

Vice Mayor (1995–1998)
In 1995, Catindig was elected as the vice mayor of Santa Rosa, Laguna. He ran for mayor in 1998 but lost to Leon Arcillas.

Vice Mayor (2001–2005)
Catindig ran for Vice Mayor in 2001 and successfully regained the seat. He was then re-elected in 2004, the year when Santa Rosa became a city on July 10.

Mayor (2005–2007)
Upon the assassination and death of Leon Arcillas on May 10, 2005, Catindig took over as the mayor of Santa Rosa. On September 15, 2006, Mayor Catindig was suspended by the Office of the President thru the Executive Secretary due to abuse of authority and grave misconduct. However, he returned to office on February 10, 2007. He ran for a full term as mayor at the 2007 Elections but he lost, placing 2nd behind the deceased mayor's eldest daughter, Arlene.

Political theme
As Mayor, Catindig's primary thrust were education, health, employment and housing. Another concern of his was the heavy traffic flow on the main thoroughfares of Santa Rosa. Although it can not be totally prevented, steps have been taken to ease the flow of vehicles in the city's roads; opening all possible diversion roads and secondary routes, cleaning up the image of the traffic enforcers, instilling discipline, and courtesy, proper and correct training to wit. His call was “Tindig Bayan Sulong Mamamayan”.

Comeback attempts
Catindig ran again for Mayor of Santa Rosa in 2010 but was unsuccessful, losing to Arlene Arcillas once again. He ran for vice mayor in 2013 as the running mate of Alice Lazaga, who was running under PDP-Laban; they both lost.

City Councilor (2022-)
Catindig ran for city councilor in 2022 as an independent candidate and was proclaimed as winner, placing 5th, marking his comeback in public service after 15 years. He is the only non-member of either PDP–Laban or reelected Mayor Arlene Arcillas's ticket to clinch a seat in the city council.

References

External links
Jose B. Catindig Jr. in Santa Rosa City Official Website

1962 births
Living people
Mayors of places in Laguna (province)
People from Santa Rosa, Laguna
Adamson University alumni